The Dance Club Mara (literally: "dream", in the  meaning "hope") is the official IDSF formation team representing Belarus in IDSF world ranking competitions. The first competition of the team was in 1991. The team manager is Lydia Kats-Lazareva. The team competes both in Standard and Latin categories. So far the highest achievement for the team is finals.

The Palace of Culture of Minsk Tractor Plant  hosts the club.

References

External links
Mara at the IDSF World Formation Standard tournament - Stuttgart, Germany 2007-11-24

Ballroom dance
Formation dance teams
Belarusian culture
Performing groups established in 1991
1991 establishments in Belarus